LAR (Romanian Air Lines) was the second national airline in Romania, created primarily as a charter flights and inclusive tour airline, apart from the Romanian national airline, TAROM.

The company operated between 1975 and 1997 and employed a fleet of BAC One-Elevens. The airline's flights mainly carried holiday makers to and from Romanian resorts from airports located throughout Europe.

References

External links
Photos on airliners.net
Romanian airlines list

Defunct airlines of Romania
Airlines established in 1975
Airlines disestablished in 1997
1975 establishments in Romania
1997 disestablishments in Romania